Muttonville is an unincorporated community in Preble County, in the U.S. state of Ohio.

History
Muttonville received its name on account of sheep raising in the area, mutton being the term for their meat.

References

Unincorporated communities in Preble County, Ohio
Unincorporated communities in Ohio